Dubravko Šimenc (born 2 November 1966 in Zagreb) is a former Croatian water polo player who competed for both Yugoslavia and Croatia, and later water polo coach.  

Dubravko Šimenc's father Zlatko was a water polo player who won the silver medal at the 1964 Summer Olympics playing for Yugoslavia, and also a professor at the Faculty of Kinesiology. Šimenc's mother was a volleyball player. As a boy, Šimenc played many different sports. He started to play water polo in 1975.

Šimenc's first major medal was silver in the 1985 European Championships with Yugoslavia. The following year, his club Mladost won the World Champion title in Madrid.

He was given the honour to carry the national flag of Croatia at the opening ceremony of the 2004 Summer Olympics in Athens, becoming the 20th water polo player to be a flag bearer at the opening and closing ceremonies of the Olympics.

He gave support to Kolinda Grabar-Kitarović at the 2014–15 Croatian presidential election.

See also
 Croatia men's Olympic water polo team records and statistics
 Yugoslavia men's Olympic water polo team records and statistics
 List of Olympic champions in men's water polo
 List of Olympic medalists in water polo (men)
 List of players who have appeared in multiple men's Olympic water polo tournaments
 List of men's Olympic water polo tournament top goalscorers
 List of flag bearers for Croatia at the Olympics
 List of world champions in men's water polo
 List of World Aquatics Championships medalists in water polo

References

External links
 

1966 births
Living people
Croatian male water polo players
Croatian water polo coaches
Yugoslav male water polo players
Olympic silver medalists for Croatia in water polo
Olympic water polo players of Yugoslavia
Olympic gold medalists for Yugoslavia
Water polo players at the 1988 Summer Olympics
Water polo players at the 1996 Summer Olympics
Water polo players at the 2000 Summer Olympics
Water polo players at the 2004 Summer Olympics
Sportspeople from Zagreb
Medalists at the 1996 Summer Olympics
Medalists at the 1988 Summer Olympics
Croatian people of Slovenian descent
Expatriate water polo players
Croatian expatriate sportspeople in Italy